Pterolophia biarcuata is a species of beetle in the family Cerambycidae. It was described by James Thomson in 1858. It has a wide distribution in Africa.

References

biarcuata
Beetles described in 1858